Köln-Longerich is a railway station situated at Longerich, Cologne in western Germany. It is served by the S11 line of the Rhine-Ruhr S-Bahn.

References

External links

S11 (Rhine-Ruhr S-Bahn)
Railway stations in Cologne
Rhine-Ruhr S-Bahn stations
Railway stations in Germany opened in 1855